Ilze is a given name. Notable people with the name include:

Ilze Bērziņa (born 1984), Latvian chess player and Woman Grandmaster (2009)
Ilze Blicavs, former Australian women's basketball player
Ilze Graubiņa (1941–2001), Latvian pianist
Ilze Gribule (born 1984), Latvia javelin thrower
Ilze Hattingh (born 1996), South African tennis player
Ilze Jākobsone (born 1994), Latvian basketball player
Ilze Jaunalksne (born  1976), Latvian journalist
Ilze Krontāle (born 1986), Latvian ice hockey player
Ilze Lankhaar or Candee Jay (born 1981), Dutch electronica artist
Ilze Rubene (1958–2002), Latvian chess player and Woman International Master
Ilze Viņķele (born 1971), Latvian politician, current Minister for Welfare of Latvia

Latvian feminine given names
Feminine given names